Belair, legally Belair Airlines AG, was a Swiss charter airline headquartered in Glattbrugg operating out of Zürich Airport and EuroAirport Basel Mulhouse Freiburg. It was a subsidiary of Air Berlin and operated under the Air Berlin brand name until the 31 March 2017. During the 2017 summer season, it flew on behalf of its sister company Niki and was shuttered by then-bankrupt Air Berlin on 28 October 2017.

History

The first Balair (1925-1931)

Basler Aviation AG - Balair was founded by Balz Zimmermann in 1925 in Basel. The name Balair is a reference to the French name of the Basel: Bâle. The first route was from Basel to Freiburg and Mannheim. Balair grew rapidly. In 1929 Basel Airport was the largest airport in Switzerland, with direct flights to Zurich, Geneva, Lyon, Karlsruhe and Frankfurt. In response to the Great Depression, Balair (based in Basel) and Ad Astra Aero (based in Zurich) merged on 1 January 1931 to form Swissair, headquartered in Zurich. Up to that point, Balair had carried over 18,000 passengers, 320 tons of cargo and 143 tons of mail. The company only flew in the summer and was mainly financed by federal subsidies and transportation of mail for the Swiss post office.

The second Balair (1953-1993)

On 5 October 1952, the Basel electorate voted for the creation of a limited company. Soon then, the second Balair was founded in January 1953, with Hans Peter Tschudin elected as the first president. In its early years, Balair was active in flight training, aircraft maintenance and handling Swissair aircraft at Basel-Mulhouse Airport. Balair entered the charter business with the acquisition of two Vickers Vikings in June 1957. In 1959, Swissair acquired a 40% stake in Balair. Two Swissair DC-4s were added to the fleet and later the DC-6 came into service in 1961.

During the Biafran airlift (1967–71), chartered aircraft, including C-97 Stratocruisers, delivered humanitarian aid to a remote Biafran airstrip in eastern Nigeria.

The airline's first jet aircraft was the Convair 990 Coronado and then the McDonnell Douglas DC-9-32 entered service followed by a Douglas DC-8-63CF which it flew on routes to Colombo, Bangkok and Rio de Janeiro.

In 1979, Balair added a McDonnell Douglas DC-10-30 to its fleet. By 1982, Balair became an all jet airline and by 1986, the Airbus A310-300 and MD-82 were the mainstay of the fleet. Later, Swissair operated charter flights using the Balair name. By this time, Swissair was a majority owner.

BalairCTA (1993-1995)
In 1993, Balair and CTA – Compagnie de Transport Aérien were merged and formed a new airline named BalairCTA. For political reasons, the registered office of the company was in Geneva and the accounting department in Basel. The operational base was moved to Zurich. Despite restructuring and mass layoffs, the Swissair charter business was unprofitable and operations ended in 1995. Short-haul operations were transferred to Crossair and long-haul operations to Swissair.

The new Balair (1997-2001)

In 1997, Swissair's charter business was outsourced again and on 1 November 1997, BalairCTA resumed operations as a subsidiary of Swissair, reverting to the Balair name. On short and medium-haul routes, two Boeing 757-200s were operated exclusively for tour operator Hotelplan and its subsidiaries ESCO-Reise and M-Travel. The lessee was also Hotelplan. Balair also had two Boeing 767-300ERs for long-haul operations. However, the new Balair was affected by the failure of Swissair. On 5 October 2001, the last Balair flight landed in Zurich. The Boeing 767s were returned to the lessor.

Belair (2001-2017)

After consulting Migros (its parent company), Hotelplan founded a new charter airline named Belair and transferred their Boeing 757s to it. It entered into the commercial register on 16 October 2001. The minor name change meant it was possible to repaint the two Migros-owned Boeing 757s with very little effort. 120 Balair employees were employed by the new company.

The first Belair commercial flight took place on 3 November 2001, departing from Zurich. Flights were mainly to Mediterranean resorts. Besides the two Boeing 757s it operated, Belair also leased a Boeing 767-300ER for long-haul operations.

As part of the partnership with REGA (Swiss Air Rescue), a 757 was redesigned by Belair to be used as a rescue aircraft for repatriations in case of disasters.

Part of Air Berlin

Air Berlin acquired 49% of Belair in 2007 and fully owned it after October 2009. This increased Air Berlin's presence in Switzerland and provided Migros customers access to more flights. While Air Berlin owned Belair, Belair was managed from Berlin and Air Berlin only published consolidated financial statements. Air Berlin Switzerland (Air Berlin pilots), the CHS Switzerland (Air Berlin flight attendants) and Belair were combined to form the new company Belair on 1 January 2010.

Belair flew from Zurich, Basel and Geneva to Mediterranean destinations and the Canary Islands. The aircraft used to have Belair signage combined with Air Berlin's corporate design, but then wore Air Berlin's livery. Due to bilateral traffic rights, certain routes to non-EU countries continued to use Belair's IATA code, 4T.

Shutdown
On 15 January 2017, it was announced that Belair would shut down all routes from EuroAirport Basel Mulhouse Freiburg.

On 1 April 2017, the four Airbus A321-200s began to operate on behalf of Niki and switched from Air Berlin to Niki flight numbers on routes to EU destinations.

Belair ceased operations on 28 October 2017. In December 2017, it was reported that Belair lacked the funds to pay outstanding salaries and other expenses and might face bankruptcy.

Destinations
These are the final destinations of Belair prior to its shutdown on 28 October 2017:

Fleet

Final fleet

As of August 2017, the Belair fleet consisted of the following aircraft:

Retired fleet
Over the years, Belair had previously operated the following aircraft:

Accidents and incidents
On May 15, 1960, a Douglas DC-4 (registered HB-ILA) was being ferried from Jeddah to Dakar when it crashed in the Djebel Marr Mountains due to a navigation error. All 12 crew members were killed.
September 13, 1964, a Fokker F-27 Friendship (registered HB-AAI) was approaching Málaga Airport with a steep descent. It touched down heavily, causing the centre section of the wings to break apart and skidded before coming to rest. All 45 occupants on board survived.

See also
List of defunct airlines of Switzerland

References

Annotations

External links

Timetable images
airberlin.com about Belair

Defunct airlines of Switzerland
Airlines established in 1925
Airlines disestablished in 2017
 
Air Berlin
Swiss companies established in 1925
Opfikon
Companies based in the canton of Zürich
Swiss companies disestablished in 2017